Harry Arthur Smith (born 10 October 1932) is an English former professional footballer who played as a full back in the Football League for Torquay United and Bristol City. He was born in Wolverhampton.

Career
Smith joined West Bromwich Albion as an amateur, but left to join Torquay United in 1953 without breaking into the Baggies' first team.

He made his Torquay debut in a 3–1 win away to Walsall on 5 December 1953, with the regular left-back Jimmy Drinkwater out of the side. He initially lost his place when Drinkwater returned, but after two games out of the side, regained his place, Drinkwater switching to right-back as the on-loan Harry Parfitt missed out. He began the following season as the regular left-back in the Torquay side, playing in the FA Cup 4th round tie at home to Huddersfield Town in front of a record crowd of 21,908, which Huddersfield won 1–0. He lost his place late in the season, with John Anderton taking his place and played just 14 times in the 1955–56 season.

He started the 1956–57 season out of the first team with Anderton and then regular centre-half John James playing at left-back. However, Smith soon regained his place and remained a regular for the remainder of the season as Torquay lost out on promotion to Division Two on goal average from Ipswich Town.

He played 188 league games for Torquay, scoring just once, before leaving in July 1961 to join Bristol City. He played just once for the Ashton Gate side before leaving league football to settle down in Torquay, where he became an avid pigeon racer.

References

1932 births
Living people
Footballers from Wolverhampton
English footballers
Torquay United F.C. players
Bristol City F.C. players
English Football League players
Association football fullbacks